The Fly Synthesis Catalina NG is an Italian ultralight and light-sport amphibious flying boat, designed and produced by Fly Synthesis, introduced at the Aero show held in Friedrichshafen in 2010. The aircraft is supplied as a complete ready-to-fly-aircraft.

Design and development
The manufacturer says the design borrowed from the development of the earlier Fly Synthesis Storch, stating, "The Catalina NG project evolved from the Storch amphibious aircraft experience".

The Catalina was designed to comply with the Fédération Aéronautique Internationale microlight rules and US light-sport aircraft rules. It features a strut-braced high-wing, a two-seats-in-side-by-side configuration open cockpit, electrically retractable tricycle landing gear and a single engine in tractor configuration.

The aircraft is made from composite material, predominantly carbon fibre and fibreglass. The standard engine available is the  Rotax 582 two-stroke powerplant. Folding wings and a ballistic parachute are optional equipment.

Specifications (Catalina NG)

References

External links

2010s Italian ultralight aircraft
Light-sport aircraft
High-wing aircraft
Single-engined tractor aircraft
Flying boats